Charles P. Emmett was an English professional footballer who played as a left back.

Career
Born in Newcastle, Emmett played for St Anthony's, Bradford City and Dipton United.

For Bradford City he made one appearance in the Football League.

Sources

References

Year of birth missing
Year of death missing
English footballers
Association football fullbacks
Bradford City A.F.C. players
Dipton United F.C. players
English Football League players